Prairie Home is an unincorporated community in Lancaster County, Nebraska, United States.

In 1872, there was a post office at the location of the future town. In 1891, the village was platted by the Chicago, Rock Island, and Pacific Railroad. The town's name was derived from a farm located south of the village owned by a Mr. Waite called Prairie Home. The post office in the village stopped service in 1968.

Demographics

Education
It is in the Waverly School District 145.

References

Unincorporated communities in Lancaster County, Nebraska
Unincorporated communities in Nebraska